The 2002–03 DFB-Pokal was the 60th season of the annual German football cup competition. Sixty-four teams competed in the tournament of six rounds which began on 28 August 2002 and ended on 31 May 2003. In the final, Bayern Munich defeated 1. FC Kaiserslautern 3–1, thereby claiming their 11th title.

Matches

First round

Second round

Round of 16

Quarter-finals

Semi-finals

Final

References

External links
 Official site of the DFB 
 Kicker.de 

2002-03
2002–03 in German football cups